Piet Alexander Tallo (27 May 1942 – 25 April 2009) was an Indonesian politician. He was governor of East Nusa Tenggara in 1998–2008. Because he was seriously ill since 2007, the governor often handed tasks over to his vice governor, Frans Lebu Raya, who was elected as governor through the election in 2008. He received a law degree from the Gadjah Mada University in 1970. Tallo also served as regent of South Central Timor Regency in 1983–1993. Tallo died from an acute asthma attack on 25 April 2009.

References

External links
http://www.pemda-ntt.go.id/PimpWilayah
https://web.archive.org/web/20070929141644/http://kompas.com/kompas-cetak/0601/06/daerah/2343511.htm

1942 births
2009 deaths
Governors of East Nusa Tenggara
Deaths from asthma
People from East Nusa Tenggara
Gadjah Mada University alumni